Cecilia Johansdotter of Sweden (fl. 1193) is the possible name of the wife of King Canute I of Sweden and mother of King Eric X of Sweden. Little is known about her except that she was of aristocratic origins and died sometime after 1193.

Biography 

Despite the fact that she was queen for over twenty years, the queen consort of King Canute is one of the most unknown of Swedish queens. Neither her name, her parents or her birth and death years are confirmed. Canute I stated in a letter to Pope Clement III that his bride was the only one who was of sufficiently high status to marry him, which may point to royal connections. Some historians guess that she was the daughter of John, son of King Sverker I of Sweden (d. 1156). The assumption that she carried the name Cecilia rests on the hypothesis that an annal entry from the 14th century has been twisted. This text states that the mother of Eric the Saint (d. 1160) was called Cecilia, the sister of Ulf Jarl and Kol and the daughter of a king Sven (presumably alluding to Blot-Sweyn). This in turn can be compared with a genealogy that mentions Ubbe (Ulf), Kol and Burislev as the sons of John Sverkersson. Their implied sister Cecilia would then have been the mother of Eric X of Sweden, whose father was Canute I, rather than being the mother of Eric the Saint. The hypotheses might be strengthened by a 13th-century painting in the church of Dädesjö mentioning the names Canute and (possibly) Cecilia.

However, a marriage alliance between the two feuding royal clans of Sverker and Eric is not entirely plausible. A contemporary document shows that she was the sister of another nobleman called Canute, known in an (alleged) lost document as Canute Ulvhildsson. According to an alternative hypothesis, the Queen's brother Canute was the son of an Ingeborg, daughter of Sigvard. These three persons were all donators to Vårfruberga Abbey. Some early-modern writers allege that the queen was a sister of Jarl Birger Brosa which is considered highly unlikely. As a girl (juuencula), the lady was to have been married to Prince Canute Eriksson about the year 1160, but the murder of Eric the Saint forced her to enter a convent while Canute escaped. In 1167, seven years later, her husband became King and she was made Queen of Sweden.

There is only one story that truly mentions the Queen in more detail. In c. 1190, the Queen was taken ill. It was a grave illness, and people worried that she would die. To avoid death, the Queen promised on her sick bed, that if God would spare her life, she would enter a convent after her recovery to show her gratitude. Eventually, she recovered from her sickness, but did not wish to become a nun, nor did her husband wish it. They sent an appeal to the Pope in Rome to ask if she could be released from her promise and continue her marital obligations. Canute argued that he must secure the support of her relatives in order to fight the pagans east of the Baltic Sea, and therefore maintain married life. The current Pope Celestine III wrote back to the Swedish bishops and asked that the circumstances should be further verified. The outcome is not known. This letter is dated to 1193. The year of her death is unknown.

Cecilia Blanka
Queen Cecilia Johansdotter is used as a character in a book by author Jan Guillou in 1998, where she was used to create the fictional queen, Cecilia Blanka.

Marriage
She was betrothed, around 1160, with Canute Eriksson of Sweden (King, 1167). The marriage was concluded in about 1167, but was (at least temporarily) dissolved when she was obliged to enter a convent in the 1190s (see above).

Children
 N.N. son (slain November 1205 at Älgarås)
 N.N. son (slain November 1205 at Älgarås)
 N.N. son (slain November 1205 at Älgarås)
Eric X of Sweden, (d. 1216), King of Sweden 1208–1216.
 Daughter, NN Knutsdotter (possibly Sigrid, or Karin), who is said to have married either jarl Knut Birgersson (and become mother of Magnus Broka), or married Magnus Broka himself (and with Magnus had a son Knut Magnusson, or, Knut Katarinason, claimant of Swedish throne; killed in 1251). Existence of this daughter is based on unclear mentions in old saga and chronicle material, and is to an extent accepted in research literature, to explicate Knut Magnusson's hereditary claim to the throne. This daughter was by necessity born in the 1170s or 1180s. She is also proposed by old romantical-looking genealogies as mother of a duke's daughter, Cecilia Knutsdotter (by necessity born near 1208 at earliest), whose parentage however is fully shrouded in mists of history.

References

Literature
 Ahnlund, Nils, "Vreta klosters äldsta donatorer", Historisk tidskrift 65, 1945.
 Hans Gillingstam, "Knut Eriksson", https://sok.riksarkivet.se/Sbl/Presentation.aspx?id=11661
 
 Kjellberg, Carl M., "Erik den heliges ättlingar", Historisk tidskrift 8, 1888.
 Åke Ohlmarks, Alla Sveriges drottningar (All the queens of Sweden) (Swedish)
 Schück, Adolf, "Från Viby till Bjälbo. Studier i Sveriges historia under 1100-talets andra hälft", Fornvännen 1951.

12th-century births
Year of death unknown
Place of birth unknown
Swedish queens
12th-century Swedish nuns
House of Eric